Tiszaörs is a village in Jász-Nagykun-Szolnok county, in the Northern Great Plain region of central Hungary.

Geography

Tiszaörs bath
The alkaline hydrogenated iadous boiling water gushed up in 1932.

Notable residents
 Pál Balkay, painter

References

External links
 Official site in Hungarian

Populated places in Jász-Nagykun-Szolnok County